Twin Falls can refer to:

Cities and counties 
 Twin Falls, Idaho
 Twin Falls County, Idaho
 Twin Falls, Arizona

Waterfalls 
In Australia
 Twin Falls (Northern Territory), a waterfall in the Kakadu National Park in the Northern Territory

In Canada
 Twin Falls (British Columbia), a waterfall in Yoho National Park, British Columbia
 Twin Falls (Labrador), a waterfall and hydroelectric generating station in Labrador

In the Philippines
 Twin Falls (Camarines Sur), a waterfall named Itbog Falls located in Buhi, Camarines Sur

In the United States
 Twin Falls (Idaho), a waterfall in Idaho, the namesake of the city of Twin Falls
 Twin Falls (Montana), a waterfall in the Glacier National Park
 Twin Falls (Oregon), a waterfall in the Silver Falls State Park.
 Twin Falls (South Carolina), a waterfall near Pickens
 Twin Falls (Washington), a waterfall near North Bend in Washington state
 Twin Falls (Hawaii), a waterfall in Maui, Hawaii

In music 
Twin Falls (band), an indie electronic folk band from Somerset, England
"Twin Falls", a song from the 1994 album There's Nothing Wrong with Love by Built to Spill
"Twin Falls", a live cover released by Ben Folds Five on their 1998 album Naked Baby Photos

Other 
 USNS Twin Falls (T-AGM-11), a missile range instrumentation ship
 Twin Falls Resort State Park, Saulsville, West Virginia